The Rockefeller University Press (RUP) is a department of Rockefeller University.

Journals
Rockefeller University Press publishes three scientific journals: Journal of Experimental Medicine, founded in 1896, Journal of General Physiology, founded in 1918, and Journal of Cell Biology, founded in 1955 under the title The Journal of Biophysical and Biochemical Cytology.  All editorial decisions on manuscripts submitted to the three journals are made by active scientists in conjunction with in-house scientific editors, and all peer-review operations and pre-press production functions are carried out at the Rockefeller University Press offices. In 2018, Rockefeller University Press partnered with EMBO Press and Cold Spring Harbor Laboratory Press to publish the "Life Science Alliance" journal.

Focus
Rockefeller University Press places a strong emphasis on preserving the integrity of primary research data, and it is a pioneer in the application of new technologies to achieve that goal.

Open access policy
Rockefeller University Press provides public access to the articles it publishes. All content of Journal of Experimental Medicine, Journal of Cell Biology, and Journal of General Physiology (back to volume 1, issue 1) is hosted by HighWire Press and PubMed Central, where it is available to the public for free 6 months after publication under a Creative Commons license.

See also

 List of English-language book publishing companies
 List of university presses

References

External links
Rockefeller University Press
Journal of Cell Biology
Journal of Experimental Medicine
Journal of General Physiology
The Rockefeller University

University presses of the United States
Rockefeller University